Saint-Germer-de-Fly Abbey is a former Benedictine abbey located in the village of Saint-Germer-de-Fly, in Picardy in the Oise département of France. Only the late Romanesque-early Gothic church remains, now the village parish church.  It is regarded as one of the earliest manifestations of the Gothic style in France. A Gothic chapel added in the mid-13th century is noted as a smaller-scale reinterpretation of the Sainte-Chapelle of Paris.

History 
The abbey was originally built in the 7th century by Saint Germer, its founder and first abbot, as a Benedictine abbey. It was destroyed twice during the invasions of the Normans in the 9th and early 10th centuries, and re-founded as a Cistercian abbey in the 12th century by the Bishop of Beauvais. The relics of Saint Germer were moved from Beauvais Cathedral to the abbey in 1132. In the decade of 1130 the abbey built a basilica church in an advanced Romasque style that permitted an unusual amount of light into the interior of the church. The visual lightness of the construction at Saint-Germer-de-Fly was unprecedented and presaged the later Gothic style, with its emphasis on light and lightness.

About 1260, Pierre de Wessencourt, the 25th abbot, built the Marian Chapel at the chevet of the abbey church, which closely resembled the Sainte-Chapelle in Paris, built a few years earlier.  It is connected to the main church by a narrow passage, and is composed of three vaults with stained glass window-walls.  While less lofty than the Sainte-Chapelle, and without its original painted interior, the stonework is more decorated and detailed than the Sainte-Chapelle. It was used as a funerary chapel.

The abbey suffered greatly during the Hundred Years' War, losing its western front and six vaults.  In 1414 the troops of the Duke of Burgundy destroyed the towers and one bay of the nave.  The present west front was rebuilt in the 16th century.

In 1644 the abbey was transferred to the reformed Benedictine Congregation of St. Maur, who continued the rebuilding.

Like all other monasteries of France, Saint-Germer-de-Fly was confiscated as State property during the French Revolution and the abbey buildings were destroyed.  After the Revolution, the surviving church became the town's parish church.  The northern transept, weakened by the removal of tributary structures, was rebuilt in 1808.

Description 

The abbey forms a Latin cross, terminating at the head in a semicircle.  The façade is quite plain, in contrast with the rest of the church. The Sainte-Chapelle is a delicate work of Rayonnant Gothic architecture.

Notes

References 
 Romanes.com: Photographs of Saint-Germer-de-Fly 
 Deed of 11 May 1248 of the ordinary of Beauvais regarding the sale of land to the abbey (Latin text and translation into French) 
 Kimpel, Dieter, 1990: L'architecture gothique en France 1130-1270. Paris: Flammarion.

External links 
 Photos of Sainte Chapelle en Saint-Germer-de-Fly  

.

Benedictine monasteries in France
Cistercian monasteries in France
Christian monasteries established in the 9th century
Monasteries destroyed during the French Revolution
Churches in Oise
Chapels in France
Gothic architecture in France